Delbert Miller was a member of the Wisconsin State Assembly.

Biography
Miller was born on February 27, 1885, in Muskego, Wisconsin. He later moved with his parents to what is now West Allis, Wisconsin.

Career
Miller was elected to the Assembly in 1916 and re-elected in 1918. Later, he served as Mayor of West Allis in 1937. He was a Republican.

References

External links
The Political Graveyard

People from Muskego, Wisconsin
People from West Allis, Wisconsin
Mayors of places in Wisconsin
1885 births
Year of death missing
Republican Party members of the Wisconsin State Assembly